Suvineetha Weerasinghe (born May 19, 1947 as සුවිනීතා වීරසිංහ) [Sinhala]), is an actress in Sri Lankan cinema theater and television. Highly versatile actress with a career spanning more than five decades, Weerasinghe has portrayed many critically acclaimed films such as Sikuruliya, Welikathara, Yuganthaya and Sudo Sudu.

Personal life
Her father was an ex-gunman at the Army and mother was a housewife. She started junior school with Buddhist Girls College in Mount Lavinia until grade 5 and then attended to Dehiwela Madya Maha Vidyalaya. At the school, she was an athlete and a strong netball shooter. She also completed all three stages of Kandyan dancing at school times. After finishing school, she enrolled with Indigenous Medical College for a four-year course. However, while studying at third year, Weerasinghe quit from medical college and entered cinema industry.

She was first married to late Tissa Abeysekara, who was a renowned director in Sinhala cinema. She has one son from her second marriage with Sarath Kongahage. Her son Devinda Kongahage is also a director in Sinhala cinema.

Acting career
In television, she acted in some critically acclaimed serials such as H. D. Premaratne's Sandun Gira Gini Ganee and Dharmasena Pathiraja's adaptation of Anton Chekhov's Lady with the Little Dog.

Selected television serials

 Bim Kaluwara
 Kaluwara Anduna
 Nonimi Yathra 
 Piniwassa
 Ran Dalambuwo
 Sandun Giri Gini Ganee
 Wansakkarayo

Beyond acting
She was one of the judges reality show Guwan Prathibha Prabha in drama category.

She contested from National List of Democratic National Alliance in 2010 General Election.

Filmography
Her maiden cinematic experience came through 1962 film Suhada Divi Piduma, directed by Robin Tampoe. Some of her popular films are Sudo Sudu, Sikuruliya Anupama and Welikathara.

Awards

Presidential Film Awards

|-
|| 1985 ||| Sathi Pooja || Merit Award ||

References

External links
 සුවිනීතා වීරසිංහ - Suvinitha Weerasinghe
 Distribution of spectacles for needy people

Living people
Sri Lankan film actresses
1947 births